This is a list of seasons completed by the Northern Iowa Panthers football team of the National Collegiate Athletic Association (NCAA) Division I Football Championship Subdivision (FCS).
The Panthers fielded their first team in 1895 with no head coach designated. The first head coach was Fred Wolff and currently is Mark Farley.

There was no football team fielded during the 1906 and 1907 seasons because it was deemed "...too severe to be played at the institution." Northern Iowa did not play football during the 1943 and 1944 seasons because of World War II.

Seasons

Bowl results

Playoff results
Any playoff appearance prior to 1978 was in the NCAA Division II playoffs. All subsequent appearances were in Division I-AA, now known as Football Championship Subdivision. When Division I-AA was formed for football in 1978, the playoffs included just four teams, doubling to eight teams in its fourth season of 1981. In 1982 the I-AA playoffs were expanded to 12 teams, with each of the top four seeds receiving a first-round bye and a home game in the quarterfinals. In its ninth season of 1986, the I-AA playoffs were expanded again, to the present 16-team format, requiring four post-season victories to win the title. In April 2008 the NCAA announced that the playoff field will again expand to include 20 teams beginning in 2010. The playoffs expanded to 24 teams starting in 2013.

Notes

References

Northern Iowa

Northern Iowa Panthers football seasons